The Durham Palatinates are an English women's basketball team based in Durham, England. The Palatinates compete in the Women's British Basketball League (WBBL), the premier women's basketball competition in the United Kingdom.

History
The Palatinates officially joined the Women's British Basketball League in May 2017.   The Durham University-backed team is a relaunch from the men's Wildcats team that competed in the British Basketball League between 2011 and 2015. Women's university team and former Wildcats head coach Lee Davie was retained as the Palatinates' first head coach.

Home Venue
Queen's Sports Centre (2017-2019)
Sports and Wellbeing Park (2019-present)

Season-by-season records

Players

Current roster

Honours
WBBL Trophy Runners Up (1): 2018-19 
WBBL Cup Runners Up (1): 2019-20

See also
Durham Wildcats

References

Women's basketball teams in England
Women's British Basketball League teams
Basketball teams established in 2017
2017 establishments in England
Sport at Durham University